Mohammed Salem Al Enazi (birth 22 November 1976) is a retired Emirati football striker. Born in Qatar, he represented the Qatar national football team and is considered one of best top goal scorer for Qatar, having scored 32 goals. 

He won the top scorer award in the UAE Pro League in 2001 and 2002.

Club career

Early career
He started his playing career in the youth team of Umm Salal, then in the Qatari 2nd Division, as a goalkeeper. At the age of 13, he moved to Al Rayyan. He competed with Mansoor Muftah, considered the best Qatari striker of all time, for a place in the starting line-up. He was the world's fourth highest scorer in 1996, which is the first and only time a Qatari has made the list. Iraqi club Talaba SC tried to sign him on loan 1996, which would have made him the first foreign professional footballer in Iraq, but the transfer was never materialized.

Al Nassr (loan)

1997–98
In 1997, while visiting a friend in Riyadh, he was told that Al Nassr wanted sign him on loan. He accepted, stating that playing for Al Nassr was his childhood dream. He played in a friendly match against World XI that year, being 1 of the 12 players representing Asia XI. He scored a goal in the match, although Asia XI went on to lose 3–5. In 1998, playing alongside legendary strikers Hristo Stoichkov and Majed Abdullah, he won the Asian Cup Winners Cup. He assisted Stoichkov in scoring the only goal in the final against Suwon, an assist which he describes as the most valuable assist in his career.

Bayern Munich trial

1999–00
In October 1999, he had a trial with German club Bayern Munich. He played on Bayern's team in a friendly tournament and was known as 'the Sheikh'. Nonetheless, after he had returned to Qatar from his trial, he was not contacted by Bayern Munich. He would meet his future Al Wahda teammate, Sérgio, during his trial.

He also had two trials with West Ham United during this period, one of which came directly after his trial with Bayern.

Yimpaş Yozgatspor

2000–01
Despite an unsuccessful trial for Bayern Munich in October 1999, Enazi became the first Qatari player to play football professionally in Europe. He joined Turkish club Yimpaş Yozgatspor on a 1-year deal after the foreign player quota in the Turkish league was increased to 6 players in 2000. He played only 107 minutes in the league for the club between August and September 2000. His debut came on 19 August against Denizlispor, and he played his last league match against Çaykur Rizespor 10 September.

He would transfer to the UAE Pro-League only one month after his last match with Yimpaş.

Al Wahda

2000–01
After leaving Yimpaş, he joined Al Wahda in November 2000, becoming the first-ever Qatari footballer to play professional in the Emirati league. He was registered as one of the club's two professionals, having replaced Congolese striker Jerry Tendeleu in the fifth stage of league matches for a transfer fee of $310,000. He made his debut against Al Jazira in a local derby match on 9 November, scoring his first goal 2 minutes into the match, and finishing off with a hat-trick. He helped his club win the league title and the FA Cup that season, and was dubbed the 'Hat-trick man' due to scoring hat-tricks in three successive matches. In the league, he scored 11 goals in his first eight matches, including 2 hat-tricks, against Al Jazira and Al Ahli. He was named the UAE Pro-League top scorer in 2001 with 22 goals scored in 17 matches Overall, he scored three hat-tricks, and one super hat-trick in the league.

He scored a hat-trick against Al Urooba in the President's Cup preliminary stage. However, Al Wahda crashed out of the President's Cup in their first match against Al Sharjah, losing 1–0 in a match which many of their key players were missing from, including Enazi.

2001–02
In his second season, he formed a partnership with Sierra Leone national Lamin Conteh, which led to him in being named the top scorer in the league in 2002.

2002–03
He suffered an injury in the 2002–03 season minutes after scoring a goal against Al Shabab on 12 December in a league match. He fell out of favor with the club's board and supporters late in the season (scored 5 ligue goals), and he joined Al Jazira in 2004.

Qatari football ban
He reportedly signed a contract with Al Rayyan in 2003, but had missed team workouts for two consecutive weeks. It was later found out by the administration that he wasn't in Qatar, and had been in the United Arab Emirates. Al Rayyan filed a complaint to the Qatar Football Association, and the latter officially banned Enazi from the Qatar national team and the Qatari League. Qatar national team coach Philippe Troussier had called up Enazi, but due to his ban he was unable to join the national team.

Al Jazira

2003–04
Al Jazira's Dutch coach, Piet Hamberg, brought Enazi into the team's squad in January 2004. He scored his first hat-trick for the club on 10 March 2004 against Sharjah, however, his team only managed a 3–3 draw after the referee controversially awarded Sharjah with 2 penalties.

2004–05
He was the top scorer of the league in the early stages, scoring 9 goals in the first nine matches. He played offence with striker Mohammed Omar who joined the club in January 2005.

2005–06
He struggled to stay in the first team in the 2005–06 season after sustaining an injury in August which left him out of action for 4 months. The departure of head coach Sef Vergoossen in December resulted in Enazi seeing less playing time for the first team. As a result, he transferred to Al Wasl in 2006.

Al Wasl

2006–07
Enazi signed for Al Wasl on 21 September 2006. He was presented the no. 23 jersey by Emirati legend Zuhair Bakheet, who had donned the shirt himself during his playing days. He won the league title in his first season with Al Wasl, with his teammate Anderson being the top goalscorer in the league.

2007–08
He scored a goal against Al-Quwa Al-Jawiya in the group stage of the 2008 AFC Champions League which eliminated the Iraqi club. The 2007–08 league season was disappointing for Al Wasl, as they finished 7th place after having won the league in the prior season. He was the captain this season.

Al Nasr

2008–09
Enazi signed for Dubai-based Al Nasr in September 2008, when the club was overgoing a major player overhaul in preparation for the 2008–09 season. Luka Bonačić, the coach of Al Nasr, did not support his arrival and sought to sell Enazi. Additionally, he benched him for the majority of the 2008–09 season. Bonačić had displayed the same attitude towards a number of new arrivals to the club that season, resulting in the board of directors sacking him in January 2009. Enazi retired from football shortly after, appearing in only 5 league matches for the club.

Retirement
He retired in 2009 while playing for Al Nasr. He ventured into management, working as the general manager of Emirati club Al Jazira as of 2010.

Career statistics

Citizenship
Enazi was reported as being born in Riyadh, Saudi Arabia and after the 1996 Gulf Cup of Nations, rumours spread that his family were bidoons from Kuwait. He denied those claims and stated that he was born in Qatar.

He received Emirati citizenship in 2004. His brother, Mohannad Salem Al Enazi, also has Emirati citizenship, and has represented the UAE national team at the senior level.

Honours

Individual
 1996 Gulf Cup of Nations: Top Scorer
1996 GCC Champions League: Top Scorer
1998 FIFA World Cup Preliminary qualifiers: Top Scorer
Qatar Stars League: Top Scorer
UAE Pro-League: Top Scorer (2)

References

External links
 
 Mohamed Salem Al Enazi – International Goals

1976 births
Living people
People from Doha
Qatari footballers
Qatar international footballers
Emirati footballers
United Arab Emirates international footballers
Qatari expatriate footballers
Association football forwards
Naturalized citizens of the United Arab Emirates
Umm Salal SC players
Al-Rayyan SC players
Al Nassr FC players
Qadsia SC players
Yimpaş Yozgatspor footballers
Al Wahda FC players
Al Jazira Club players
Al-Wasl F.C. players
Al-Nasr SC (Dubai) players
2000 AFC Asian Cup players
Qatar Stars League players
Saudi Professional League players
Kuwait Premier League players
UAE Pro League players
UAE Second Division League players
Expatriate footballers in Saudi Arabia
Expatriate footballers in Kuwait
Expatriate footballers in Turkey
Qatari expatriate sportspeople in Saudi Arabia
Qatari expatriate sportspeople in Kuwait
Qatari expatriate sportspeople in Turkey
Dual internationalists (football)